Directive 2008/1/EC of the European Parliament and of the Council of 15 January 2008 concerning integrated pollution prevention and control is a directive of the European Union. It replaces the Council Directive 96/61/EC of 24 September 1996 on the same subject matter; both are commonly referred to as IPPC Directive.

From 2005 to 2007, the effect of the directive was assessed. In 2010, a revised wording was published, integrated with 6 other European directives regulating large industrial sites, into the Industrial Emissions Directive 2010/75/EU, short IED.

European IPPC Bureau 
The European IPPC Bureau was established in 1997 to organize an exchange of information between the European Commission, EU Member States, industries concerned, and non-governmental organizations promoting environmental protection for drawing up and reviewing Best Available Techniques (short: 'BAT') reference documents (short: 'BREFs'). These reference documents, specifically the BAT conclusions therein, provide the basis for EU Member States to grant operating permits for large agro-industrial installations. The information exchange is codified into law by Commission Implementing Decision 2012/119/EU and referred to as Sevilla process, named after the city of Seville where the European IPPC Bureau is located.

Similar agencies 
Climate Change Agreement
US EPA – SPCC

See also
Best Available Techniques Reference Document (BREF)
NanoMemPro IPPC Database

References

External links 
EU legislation summary
Text of the directive (pdf)
Text of directive with headers (html)
 European IPPC Bureau home page
The implementation of the IPPC Directive in Latvia / Edward Lestrade. A.540.991.28. European current law. October (2005), p. xi–xv. 984.988
Ministry of Environment and Urbanism of Turkey, EU Project to implement Chapters 1 and 2 of the Industrial Emissions Directive (repealing IPPC Directive), explanations in Turkish and English

European Union directives
2008 in the environment
Environmental law in the European Union